The Chain Nunataks are a linear series of nunataks to the west of Blue Glacier, running west-northwest–east-southeast for  between Briggs Hill and Hannon Hill, in Victoria Land. The name is one of a group in the area associated with surveying applied in 1993 by the New Zealand Geographic Board. Named with reference to a surveyor's chain.

References 

Nunataks of Victoria Land
Scott Coast